Home, Boys, Home is a compilation album by The Dubliners.

Track listing

Side One
 "Mason's Apron"
 "The Nightengale"
 "The Holy Ground"
 "Home Boys Home"
 "Master McGrath"
 "Love Is Pleasing"

Side Two
 "Rocky Road To Dublin"
 "Woman From Wexford"
 "McAlpine's Fusiliers"
 "Monto"
 "The Patriot Game"
 "The Wild Rover"

Notes

The Dubliners compilation albums
1979 compilation albums